Richard Saladin Hickmet (born 1 December 1947 in Hammersmith, London) is a British Conservative Party politician.

Early life
Of Turkish Cypriot origin, Hickmet's father, Ferid Hikmet, emigrated from Cyprus to the UK in the 1930s. His father and uncle, Nevvar Hikmet, were well known in the Turkish Cypriot community, and opened several restaurants in Soho, London in the 1940s, during World War II.

Hickmet went to Millfield School in Street, Somerset, then the Sorbonne in Paris. From the University of Hull he gained a BA.

He was called to the Bar in 1974, and practised at the Inner Temple. He was a councillor on Wandsworth Borough Council from 1978 to 1983.

Parliamentary career
Hickmet was Member of Parliament for Glanford and Scunthorpe, which he won in the Conservative landslide at the 1983 general election. However, he lost it to Labour candidate Elliot Morley at the 1987 election. Hickmet was later an unsuccessful candidate at the Eastbourne by-election in 1990 caused by the murder of Ian Gow.

His last recorded contribution in the House of Commons was during Prime Minister's Questions on 5 May 1987, during which he said that "most parents are appalled by the promotion of gay rights" in schools, before suggesting that schools should be given more independence on such matters.

He was selected as High Sheriff of Somerset for 2017–18.

Law career
Hickmet is now a barrister at law specialising in family practice and planning cases. He is based in the West Country in Somerset but frequently travels to London with his work, and has a practice spanning the whole of the West Country and the Midlands. He has also worked for Wolfestans in Plymouth, Alletsons in Bridgwater and is affiliated with Southernhay Chambers in Exeter.

Personal life
Hickmet lives in Bridgwater, Somerset with his wife. He married Susan Ludwig in 1973. They have three daughters.

References

The Times Guide to the House of Commons, Times Newspapers Ltd, 1987 & 1992
Almanac of British Politics (1999)

External links
 Barristers Directory
 Eastbourne 1990 by-election
 http://www.bridgwatercarnival.org.uk/

1947 births
Living people
British people of Turkish Cypriot descent
People from Street, Somerset
People educated at Millfield
Alumni of the University of Hull
English barristers
Conservative Party (UK) MPs for English constituencies
UK MPs 1983–1987
English people of Turkish descent
High Sheriffs of Somerset
British politicians of Turkish descent